Urumandampalayam Rayappa Gounder Krishnan (born April 1, 1944) is an Indian politician from the All India Anna Dravida Munnetra Kazhagam Party.

Early life 
Krishnan was born on May 18, 1944 to Urumandampalayam Rayappa Gounder.

Career
He served as a member of  the Rajya Sabha from July 25, 1977 to July 24, 1983.

References 

 

1944 births
Living people